

Dinosaurs

Newly named dinosaurs

Synapsids

Non-mammalian

References

1860s in paleontology
Paleontology
Paleontology 6
Paleontology, 1866 In